Nankana Sahib railway station (اسٹیشن /ਨਨਕਾਣਾ ਸਾਹਿਬ ਰੇਲਵੇ ਸਟੇਸ਼ਨ)  is located in Nankana Sahib city, Nankana Sahib district of Punjab province of Pakistan. This station is now renamed to "Baba Guru Nanak railway station.

See also
 List of railway stations in Pakistan
 Pakistan Railways

References

External links

Railway stations in Nankana Sahib District
Railway stations on Shorkot–Sheikhupura line